Buchta (feminine Buchtová) is a Czech surname. Notable people with the surname include:

 Karel Buchta (1897–1959), Czech soldier and skier
 Luboš Buchta (born 1967), Czech cross country skier
 Miloš Buchta (born 1980), Czech footballer
 Petr Buchta (born 1992), Czech footballer
 Richard Buchta (1845–1894), Austrian explorer

See also
 Czech and Polish for Buchteln, yeast-based sweet dumplings
 Czarna Buchta, a village in the Gmina Krasnopol

Czech-language surnames

de:Buchta